The Swift-class coastal patrol craft were a series of patrol vessels built for the Republic of Singapore Navy (RSN) by the Singapore Ship Building and Engineering Company (SBEC).

History
During expansion of the Republic of Singapore Navy's capabilities in the late 1970s, the need for a dedicated coastal patrol platform was identified in order to perform the coastal surveillance and patrol mission. This need was especially apparent in 1975 during Operation Thunderstorm, where RSN resorted to using the Sea Wolf-class missile gun boats to intercept Vietnamese boat people attempting to land in Singapore. This was deemed to be operationally inefficient as it deprived RSN of a critical surface strike asset. As a result, a contract was signed with the SBEC for 12 Coastal Patrol Craft (CPC). The first vessel, RSS Swift Warrior was launched on 8 June 1980 and all 12 vessels were commissioned on 20 October 1981 by then Defence Minister, Mr Howe Yong Chong.

With the transfer of the coastal patrol mission of the Police Coast Guard in 1997, the 12 CPC were transferred and recommissioned in the Police Coast Guard as the Shark class, with the first four officially handed over on 7 May 1993, another four on 24 April 1994, and the last four on 22 January 1997 as part of the formation of the Police Coast Guard Coastal Patrol Squadron.

The CPCs were decommissioned by the Police Coast Guard between 2008 and 2012 as the next generation CPCs were gradually put to service. Five of the decommissioned CPC were transferred to the Indonesian Marine Police or POLAIR on 9 February 2012.

Design

Displacement was  full load. Armament consists of a single 20 mm cannon and two machine guns. The ships carried a crew of 3 officers and 9 other ranks.

References

Citations

Bibliography

Patrol ship classes
Patrol vessels of the Republic of Singapore Navy
Ships built in Singapore